Guy Terjanian is a French mathematician who has worked on algebraic number theory. He achieved his Ph.D. under Claude Chevalley in 1966, and at that time published a counterexample to the original form of a conjecture of Emil Artin, which suitably modified had just been proved as the Ax-Kochen theorem.

In 1977, he proved that if p is an odd prime number, and the natural numbers x, y and z satisfy , then 2p must divide x or y.

See also
Ax–Kochen theorem

References

Further reading
math.unicaen.fr article Topic: Arithmetic & geometry

French people of Armenian descent
20th-century French mathematicians
Algebraists
Number theorists
Living people
Year of birth missing (living people)